The 200 Motels soundtrack to Frank Zappa's film 200 Motels was released by United Artists Records in 1971. Like the film, the album covers a loose storyline about The Mothers of Invention going crazy in the small town of Centerville and bassist Jeff quitting the group, as did his real life counterpart, Jeff Simmons, who left the group before the film began shooting and was replaced by actor Martin Lickert for the film.

The album peaked at No. 59 on the Billboard 200, though reviewers deemed it a peripheral part of Zappa's catalog.

Music and lyrics 

The rock and comedy songs "Mystery Roach", "Lonesome Cowboy Burt", "Daddy, Daddy, Daddy", "What Will This Evening Bring Me This Morning" and "Magic Fingers", and the finale "Strictly Genteel", which mixes orchestral and rock elements, were noted as highlights of the album by reviewer Richie Unterberger. François Couture, a reviewer for Allmusic, said that "Mystery Roach" contains multiple meanings, all of which have a connection to lyrical subject matter in Zappa's discography. These include the freshwater fish, as the Mothers of Invention live album Fillmore East - June 1971 contained a song referring to the mud shark, a cannabis cigarette butt, which causes the character Jeff to go crazy within the context of the film's storyline, and a combed roll hairstyle, which connects the song lyrically to "Jelly Roll Gumdrop", a song from Cruising with Ruben & the Jets. The version featured on the album is different from the version featured in the film, as it is missing small electric guitar solos by Zappa, and was not scripted as part of the film in its electric arrangement, having originally been written in three separate, unused acoustic blues-oriented arrangements. The song was not performed live.

"Dance of the Rock & Roll Interviewers" is an orchestral piece originally intended to be paired with "Touring Can Make You Crazy" as part of an early scene in which the band arrives in Centerville and is greeted by music journalists, but only part of the sequence, depicting a mannequin of Zappa being torn apart by the journalists, appeared in the final film, due to timing and budget restraints, and the "Touring Can Make You Crazy" sequence was not shot and does not appear in the film. Regarding "Touring", Couture writes that "The long double-bass notes and the overall dark atmosphere and slow tempo suggest a tiring trip."

The album features five segments which form the suite "This Town Is A Sealed Tuna Sandwich": a prologue, the "Tuna Fish Promenade", "Dance of the Just Plain Folks", a reprise of the main melody, and the conclusion "The Sealed Tuna Bolero". Only the final bolero was featured in the film. The "Tuna Sandwich" suite was scripted as being proceeded by the sequence and composition "Centerville". "Would You Like A Snack?" is a vocal version of Zappa's composition "Holiday in Berlin", which reappears throughout the album and film in different arrangements, including the "Semi-Fraudulent/Direct-From-Hollywood Overture". The lyrics of "Would You Like A Snack?" are similar to the theater piece on Zappa's live album Ahead of Their Time. Zappa earlier recorded an unrelated song of the same name, which features members of the Mothers of Invention and Jefferson Airplane singer Grace Slick.

"Redneck Eats" begins and ends with spoken dialogue featuring the character Lonesome Cowboy Burt (played by Jimmy Carl Black) heckling the orchestra, which is performing an Igor Stravinsky and Edgard Varese-influenced composition. "Janet's Big Dance Number" is about one of the film's two groupie characters and features "Slow piano chords [...] played over sustained contrabass notes. The choir enters late in the piece, picking up the Stravinskian melody sketched by the chords." "Lucy's Seduction of a Bored Violinist", follows the other groupie character, and features "a soft melody, followed by a rhythm break and a tympany roll" and a faster reprise of the "Janet" melody. The album pairs "Lucy" with the film's "Postlude", which appears during the ending credits, and is played on a harpsichord.

The second half of the album begins with the suite "Dental Hygiene Dilemma", which begins with "I'm Stealing The Towels", for which the corresponding film sequence was scripted and partially shot, before it was determined that the footage was unusable, and the sequence was cut. The main part of the suite, "Dental Hygiene Dilemma", appeared in the film as an animated cartoon by Charles Swenson, who later directed the film Down and Dirty Duck with Mothers of Invention band members and 200 Motels stars Mark Volman and Howard Kaylan.

The main part of the suite, "Dental Hygiene Dilemma" incorporates elements of rock band, orchestra and spoken dialogue, and depicts Jeff smoking a marijuana cigarette which had been dipped in Don Preston's "foamy liquids" and imagining Donovan appearing to him on a wall-mounted television as his "good conscience" and asking him not to steal the towels, while Studebacher Hoch appears to him as his evil conscience, "dressed as Jim Pons", and convinces Jeff to quit the Mothers of Invention, start his own hard rock band and play music like Grand Funk Railroad or Black Sabbath. In real life, Simmons started his own blues rock band after leaving Zappa's band, and released the album Lucille Has Messed My Mind Up for Straight Records, which Zappa produced. In "Dilemma", Volman exclaims "We got to get him back to normal before Zappa finds out and steals it and makes him do it in the movie!"

"A Nun Suit Painted on Some Old Boxes" is the first part of a suite for soprano voice, chorus, and orchestra called "I Have Seen the Pleated Gazelle". The suite criticizes organized religion and references dental floss, connecting the suite to Zappa's later song "Montana", appearing on the album Over-Nite Sensation. In the film, "A Nun Suit" precedes the "Dental Hygiene Dilemma" cartoon, but is placed before the rock song "Magic Fingers" on this album, removing the context of the line "Want to watch a dental hygiene movie?" The "Gazelle" suite continues with "Motorhead's Midnight Ranch", "Dew on the Newts We Got" and "The Lad Searches the Night for His Newts", for which the corresponding film sequence was only partially shot.

Release and reception 

200 Motels charted at No. 59 on the Billboard 200. The album was released on compact disc for the first time in 1997 in correlation with a theatrical reissue of the film. The CD edition contained extensive liner notes and artwork, a small poster for the film, and bonus tracks consisting of radio promos for the film and the single edit of the song "Magic Fingers". The album was reissued in 2021, in two editions: the original album on 2 CDs and an extended version on 6 CDs. (again including a facsimile of the original film poster)

The album was deemed to be a peripheral album in Zappa's catalog by music critics. Allmusic's Richie Unterberger critiqued what he referred to as the "growing tendency to deploy the smutty, cheap humor that would soon dominate much of Zappa's work" but said that "Those who like his late-'60s/early-'70s work [...] will probably like this fine".

Track listing
All songs written, composed and arranged by Frank Zappa.

Personnel
 Frank Zappa – bass guitar, guitar, drums, producer, orchestration
 George Duke – trombone, keyboards
 Ian Underwood – keyboards, woodwinds
 Big Jim Sullivan - guitar, orchestration
 Martin Lickert – bass guitar
 Aynsley Dunbar – drums
 Ruth Underwood – percussion
 Jimmy Carl Black – vocals
 Howard Kaylan – vocals
 Jim Pons – voices
 Mark Volman – vocals, photography
 Theodore Bikel – narrator
 Royal Philharmonic Orchestra

Production
 Bob Auger – engineer
 David McMacken – design, illustrations
 Cal Schenkel – design
 Barry Keene – overdubs, remixing
 Patrick Pending – liner notes

Charts

References

1971 soundtrack albums
Albums conducted by Frank Zappa
Albums produced by Frank Zappa
Frank Zappa albums
United Artists Records soundtracks
Musical film soundtracks